Palaeocoleus is a monotypic moth genus of the family Erebidae described by Robinson in 1975. Its only species, Palaeocoleus sypnoides, was first described by Arthur Gardiner Butler in 1886. It is found in Fiji.

References

Moths described in 1886
Herminiinae
Monotypic moth genera